The men's 200 metres sprint event at the 1948 Summer Olympics took place between 2 August and 3 August. There were 51 competitors from 28 nations. The maximum number of athletes per nation had been set at 3 since the 1930 Olympic Congress. The final was won by American Mel Patton. His countryman Barney Ewell earned silver, making this the third consecutive Games the United States took the top two spots in the event. Lloyd La Beach's bronze gave Panama a medal in its debut in the event.

Background

This was the 10th appearance of the event, which was not held at the first Olympics in 1896 but has been on the program ever since. None of the six finalists from the pre-war 1936 Games returned. The Americans were favored. Barney Ewell was the 1946 and 1947 AAU champion. Mel Patton was a short sprint specialist who had been disappointed by a fifth-place finish in the 100 metres earlier in the Games; he had never won an American title at the longer sprint distance. European champion Nikolay Karakulov did not compete because the Soviet Union did not yet participate in the Olympics.

Bermuda, Burma, Ceylon, Cuba, Iceland, Iraq, Jamaica, Pakistan, Panama, Peru, Trinidad and Tobago, and Uruguay each made their debut in the event. The United States made its 10th appearance, the only nation to have competed at each edition of the 200 metres to date.

Competition format

The competition used the four round format introduced in 1920: heats, quarterfinals, semifinals, and a final. There were 12 heats of between 3 and 6 runners each, with the top 2 men in each advancing to the quarterfinals. The quarterfinals consisted of 4 heats of 6 athletes each; the 3 fastest men in each heat advanced to the semifinals. There were 2 semifinals, each with 6 runners. Again, the top 3 athletes advanced. The final had 6 runners. The races were run on a now-standard 400 metre track.

Records

Prior to the competition, the existing World and Olympic records were as follows.

No new world or Olympic records were set during the competition.

Schedule

All times are British Summer Time (UTC+1)

Results

Heats

The fastest two runners in each of the twelve heats advanced to the quarterfinals.

Heat 1

Heat 2

Heat 3

Heat 4

Heat 5

Heat 6

Heat 7

Heat 8

Heat 9

Heat 10

Heat 11

Heat 12

Quarterfinals

The fastest three runners in each of the four heats advanced to the semifinal round.

Quarterfinal 1

Quarterfinal 2

Quarterfinal 3

Quarterfinal 4

Semifinals

The fastest three runners in each of the two heats advanced to the final round.

Semifinal 1

Semifinal 2

Final

Key: * = Time is an estimate

References

External links
Organising Committee for the XIV Olympiad, The (1948). The Official Report of the Organising Committee for the XIV Olympiad. LA84 Foundation. Retrieved 5 September 2016.

Athletics at the 1948 Summer Olympics
200 metres at the Olympics
Men's events at the 1948 Summer Olympics